Lotfi Sebti (died 26 September 2020) was a Tunisian football manager.

References

Year of birth missing
2020 deaths
Tunisian football managers
US Ben Guerdane managers
CO Médenine managers
EO Sidi Bouzid managers
Olympique Béja managers
EGS Gafsa managers
Stade Tunisien managers
CS Hammam-Lif managers
Tunisian expatriate football managers
Expatriate football managers in Saudi Arabia
Tunisian expatriate sportspeople in Saudi Arabia